The McColley Canyon Formation is a geologic formation in Nevada. It preserves fossils dating back to the Devonian period.

See also

 List of fossiliferous stratigraphic units in Nevada
 Paleontology in Nevada

References

Devonian geology of Nevada
Devonian southern paleotemperate deposits